Miss International 2011, the 51st Miss International pageant, was held on 6 November 2011 at the International Tennis Center in Chengdu, China. Elizabeth Mosquera of Venezuela crowned her successor, Fernanda Cornejo of Ecuador, at the final event.

Results

Placements

Special awards

Order of Announcements

Top 15

Top 5

Contestants
The Miss International 2011 contestants were:

References

External links
 Miss International official website

2011
2011 beauty pageants
2011 in China
Beauty pageants in China